William I (Willame) de Percy (d.1096/9), 1st feudal baron of Topcliffe in North Yorkshire, known as Willame als gernons (meaning "with whiskers"), was a French nobleman who arrived in England immediately after the Norman Conquest of 1066. He was the founder via an early 13th century female line of the powerful English House of Percy, Earls of Northumberland, and via an 18th century female line of the Dukes of Northumberland.

Origins
The Cartulary of Whitby Abbey states that Hugh d'Avranches (later 1st Earl of Chester) and William de Percy arrived in England in 1067, one year after the Norman Conquest.

It is possible that Percy had been one of the French to whom King Edward the Confessor had given lands, but who were later expelled by King Harold (d.1066). This may explain Percy's unusual Norman epithet, Als gernons ("Bewhiskered"), as the Normans were generally clean-shaven, unlike the English, and possibly  Percy had assimilated the local custom. Later generations of Percys would use the sobriquet in the form of the first name "Algernon".

The name was taken from Percy, a fief near Villedieu in the Cotentin Peninsula in Normandy. This suggests either of today's villages of Villedieu-lès-Bailleul, in the Orne département or Villedieu-les-Poêles, in the Manche département.

Landholdings
He appears in Domesday as a great landowner, holding 30 knight's fees, including some lands which had belonged to a Saxon lady, whom, "as very heire to them, in discharging of his conscience," he afterwards married. Hugh Lupus, on becoming Earl of Chester, transferred to him his great estate of Whitby in the North Riding of Yorkshire, where he re-founded the Abbey of St. Hilda's, and appointed his brother Serlo de Percy the first prior.

Consolidation
Following the rebellion of Gospatric Earl of Northumbria, and the subsequent Harrying of the North, much territory in northern England and the Earldom of Chester were granted to Hugh d'Avranches, who had been instrumental in the devastation. Percy in turn was granted territory by d'Avranches, in addition to those already held by him in-chief from the king. At the time of the Domesday Book of 1086, Percy held as a tenant-in-chief 118 manors in Lincolnshire and the North Riding of Yorkshire, with further lands in Essex and Hampshire.

Building works
Percy set about fortifying his landholdings, constructing motte and bailey castles at Spofforth and at Topcliffe, where was situated the caput of his feudal barony. He granted land to the Benedictine order and financed the construction of the new Whitby Abbey from amongst the ruins of the Anglo-Saxon Abbey of Streoneshalh.

Marriage and progeny
Percy married an English noblewoman called Emma de Porte, her epithet presumably came from her landholdings at Seamer, a once thriving manor in North Yorkshire. Possibly, the lands granted to Percy by the king were jure uxoris. By Emma de Porte, Percy had four sons:
Alan de Percy (d.1130/5), 2nd feudal baron of Topcliffe,  who married Emma de Ghent, daughter of Gilbert I de Ghent (d. circa 1095).
Walter de Percy
William de Percy, 2nd Abbot of Whitby
Richard de Percy

Death on the First Crusade
Percy accompanied Robert Curthose, Duke of Normandy, on the First Crusade, where he died within sight of Jerusalem. His body was buried at Antioch, and his heart was returned to England and was buried in Whitby Abbey.

Legacy
William's male line ended in 1174/5 on the death without male progeny of his grandson William II de Percy, but the surname "Percy" was re-adopted by the latter's grandson Richard de Louvain (d.1244), whose own "Percy" descendants again failed in the male line in 1670 on the death of Joceline Percy, 11th Earl of Northumberland. The surname was again re-adopted by the latter's great-grand-daughter's husband Sir Hugh Smithson, 4th Baronet (c.1714-1786), created Duke of Northumberland, whose descendants survive today. William's family were thus a great historical house of England "that, like Caesar's, has been artificially preserved (twice) to the present time".

References

Sources
Brenan, Gerald. A History of the House of Percy II Vols. London, 1902
Fonblanque, Edward Barrington de. Annals of the House of Percy II Vols. London, 1887

Christians of the First Crusade
William de, 1
Anglo-Normans
Norman conquest of England
People from Hambleton District
1090s deaths